Dr Harry Leitch (born 14 February 1985, in Edinburgh, Scotland) is a stem cell biologist and group leader at the MRC London Institute of Medical Sciences, and a Scottish international squash player.

Squash career
Having trained at the Heriot-Watt Squash Academy and the East of Scotland Institute of Sport, Leitch became Scotland's number one junior in 2002.

He made his debut for the Scottish senior team in 2003 and has since made over 60 international appearances. He competed at the European Championships, the World Championships and the 2006 Commonwealth Games in Melbourne, where he, and partner John White, were knocked out (8-10 9-2 9-2 3-9 9-6) in the quarterfinals by the eventual champions Lee Beachill and Peter Nicol.

In 2010, Leitch appeared at the Commonwealth Games a second time, playing alongside Alan Clyne in the Men's Doubles, and Lisa Aitken in the Mixed Doubles. He and Clyne finished 4th after losing 2–0 to the Australian team in the Bronze Medal Match.

In September 2013 Leitch was one of the first 27 athletes to be selected as part of Team Scotland for the Commonwealth Games 2014. Leitch and Clyne again reached the semi-finals in Men's Doubles but ultimately finished 4th, losing to James Willstrop and Daryl Selby in the Bronze Medal Match.

In addition, he won a record ten Blues representing the University of Cambridge on the squash court. This led to the introduction of the 'Leitch Law' in 2014, which limits the number of varsity appearances to 8 in total, essentially extending the 'Rankov Rule' from rowing to encompass all Varsity matches.

Academic career
Leitch grew up in Edinburgh, where he attended George Watson's College. Following graduation in 2003, Leitch entered the University of Cambridge, where he obtained a BA in Natural Sciences in 2007. He subsequently completed an MB/PhD at the School of Clinical Medicine and a research fellowship at Wolfson College, as well as teaching Medicine at Fitzwilliam College. He currently leads the Germline and Pluripotency group at the MRC London Institute of Medical Sciences and teaches at Imperial College London.

See also
Scotland at the 2006 Commonwealth Games
Scotland at the 2010 Commonwealth Games

References

External links 
 
 Scotland National Team Profile

1985 births
Alumni of Fitzwilliam College, Cambridge
Living people
People educated at George Watson's College
Sportspeople from Edinburgh
Scottish male squash players
Squash players at the 2006 Commonwealth Games
Commonwealth Games competitors for Scotland